Yugoslav Women's Alliance was a Yugoslavian organisation for women's rights, founded in 1919 and abolished in 1961. It was originally named  but changed name in 1929.

It was an umbrella organization of the women's movement in the newly created Yugoslavia and united two hundred and five local women's organisations and fifty thousand women.  It was the largest women's organisation in Yugoslavia. The  (founded in 1919) was later absorbed by it, and the conservative Narodna Ženska Zajednica was split from it (1926).

References

Organizations established in 1919
1919 establishments in Yugoslavia
Women's rights organizations
Women's organizations based in Yugoslavia
Women's suffrage in Yugoslavia